Hudiksvalls Hockey Club (or Hudiksvalls HC) is a Swedish hockey club based in Hudiksvall.  The team currently plays in group 1C of Division 1, the third tier of Swedish ice hockey. Hudiksvalls HC was founded in 1978. Since the 1999/2000 season, the team has regularly participated in the third-rate Division 1, which is now called Hockeyettan.

External links
Official website
Club profile on Eliteprospects.com

Ice hockey teams in Sweden
Ice hockey teams in Gävleborg County